Kim Po may refer to:
Kimberly Po (born 1971), American tennis player
ROKS Kim Po (MSC-520), South Korean naval vessel
Alternative spelling of Gimpo, city in Gyeonggi Province, South Korea